Micromorphus is a genus of flies in the family Dolichopodidae.

Species

Micromorphus aereus (Vaillant, 1953)
Micromorphus albipes (Zetterstedt, 1843)
Micromorphus alpester Negrobov, 2000
Micromorphus alutaceus Negrobov, 2000
Micromorphus amurensis Negrobov, 2000
Micromorphus aristalis (Curran, 1926)
Micromorphus asymmetricus Robinson, 1967
Micromorphus bifrons Robinson, 1964
Micromorphus caudatus (Aldrich, 1902)
Micromorphus claripennis (Strobl, 1899)
Micromorphus ellampus Wei, 2006
Micromorphus ethiopiensis Grichanov, 2013
Micromorphus fulvosetosus Parent, 1929
Micromorphus grichanovi Negrobov, 2000
Micromorphus heterophalla Wei & Yang, 2007
Micromorphus jakutensis Negrobov, 2000
Micromorphus jinshanensis (Wang, Yang & Grootaert, 2009)
Micromorphus knowltoni Robinson, 1967
Micromorphus leucostoma Robinson, 1967
Micromorphus limosorum (Vaillant, 1953)
Micromorphus lithophilus Robinson, 1967
Micromorphus longilamellatus Robinson, 1964
Micromorphus maraisi Grichanov, 2000
Micromorphus mesasiaticus Negrobov, 2000
Micromorphus micidus Parent, 1937
Micromorphus minimus (Van Duzee, 1925)
Micromorphus minusculus Negrobov, 2000
Micromorphus paludicola (Karl, 1921)
Micromorphus plebeius Parent, 1930
Micromorphus shamshevi Negrobov, 2000
Micromorphus spatulipes Parent, 1937
Micromorphus ugandensis Grichanov, 2013
Micromorphus vegrandis (Frey, 1925)

References 

Peloropeodinae
Dolichopodidae genera
Diptera of Europe
Diptera of Africa
Diptera of Asia
Diptera of North America
Diptera of South America
Taxa named by Josef Mik